Enrique Simpson Baeza (Valparaíso, 1835–Valparaíso, May 17, 1901) was a Chilean Navy officer and explorer. Simpson mapped the archipelagoes and coast of Aysén Region onboard of the corvette Chacabuco in the 1870s. Among his feats is the re-discovery of San Rafael Lake and the insight that Aisén Fjord provides the best access to the interior of Patagonia from the Pacific.

Simpson River is named after him.

References

1835 births
1901 deaths
19th-century Chilean Navy personnel
19th-century explorers
Chilean explorers
Chilean admirals
Chilean hydrographers
People from Valparaíso
Chilean Navy personnel of the Chincha Islands War
Chilean Navy personnel of the War of the Pacific
Chilean people of English descent
Explorers of Chile